The class WDS-3 was a diesel-electric locomotive used by Indian Railways for shunting and doing departmental works. The model name stands for broad gauge (W), Diesel (D), Shunting (S) 3rd generation (3). The WDS-3 is used mostly in the Northern Railway Zone (NR). All these locomotives were withdrawn by the late 1990s.

History 
The history of WDS-3 class starts in the early 1960s with the aim of the Indian Railways to address the growing requirement for a shunting locomotive. These locomotives was designed by Mak to specification set by RDSO. Many aspects of this locomotive were taken from the DB Class V 60.
They use Suri transmission developed for these diesel locomotives and were designed as shunting-cum-shuttle service locomotives. For this purpose, the reversing gear box attached to the Suri transmission was designed to have two gear stages; in the lower gear, designated as "shunting gear", the locomotive was designated to have a maximum speed of 27 Km and in the higher speed gear designated as "Mainline gear", the maximum locomotive speed was 65 I<m/h. The 1ocomotive was fit for both shunting and mainline type of services up to a limited speed of 65 Km/h. 
Subsequently, it was decided to manufacture locomotives of similar type ingeniously by CLW. These locomotive are designated as WDS4/WDS4B class. 
When the lot of 7 WDS3 shunters came, initially they had a lot of troubles with these locomotives, but the trouble was confined more to the power pack than to the transmission. But in course of time, going into detail about the troubles that were being experienced and the mechanics were able to get over a lot of these difficulties and in-fact the transmission was also modified to suit with the engine. By 1979 Out of 7 locomotives, five are still after 15 years of service working and did not have trouble. But by 1990s all units were withdrawn from service.

Former shed 

 Shakurbasti (SSB): All the locomotives of this class has been withdrawn from service.

See also 

 Rail transport in India#History
 Locomotives of India
 Rail transport in India
 Indian locomotive class WDM-2

References

Notes

Bibliography

C locomotives
Railway locomotives introduced in 1976
5 ft 6 in gauge locomotives
Diesel-hydraulic locomotives of India
MaK locomotives